Players born on or after 1 January 1983 were eligible to participate in the tournament. Players' ages as of 2 May 2002 – the tournament's opening day. Players in bold have also been capped at full international level. Thirty-player squads are as per the UEFA tournament programme.

Group A

Head coach :  Anna Signeul

Head coach:  Ignacio Quereda

Head coach :  Bruno Bini

Head coach :  Silvia Neid

Group B

Head coach :  Jarl Torske

Head coach :  Mo Marley

Head coach :  Béatrice von Siebenthal

Head coach :  Per Rud

References

UEFA Women's Under-19 Championship squads
Squads